Lieutenant General Hans Joachim Friedrich von Sydow (13 May 1762 in Zernikow / Nordwestuckermark – 27 April 1823) was a Prussian officer who fought in the Napoleonic Wars. He was honoured with a knighthood and the Blue Max (Pour le Mérite). He fought with distinction at Waterloo.

References

1762 births
1823 deaths
Prussian commanders of the Napoleonic Wars
Recipients of the Pour le Mérite (military class)
Lieutenant generals of Prussia